The fourth HMS Volunteer (D71), later I71, was a Modified W-class destroyer of the British Royal Navy that saw service in World War II.

Construction and commissioning

Volunteer was ordered in January 1918 as part of the 13th Order of the 1918-1919 Naval Programme. She was laid down on 16 April 1918 by William Denny and Brothers at Dumbarton, Scotland, and launched on 17 April 1919. She was completed on 7 November 1919 and commissioned into service the same day with the pennant number D71.

Service history

Before World War II

Volunteer entered service with the fleet in 1919. During 1921 she was assigned to the 4th Destroyer Flotilla in the Atlantic Fleet, and in 1925 she was transferred to the Mediterranean Fleet along with the rest of the flotilla. During the early 1930s, she was decommissioned, transferred to the Reserve Fleet, and placed in the Nore Reserve. She later was moved to Rosyth, Scotland, remaining in reserve there.

In August 1939, Volunteer was recommissioned with a reserve crew for the Royal Review of the Reserve Fleet in Weymouth Bay by King George VI. She then remained in commission as the fleet mobilised because of deteriorating diplomatic relations between the United Kingdom and Nazi Germany

World War II

1939
The United Kingdom entered World War II on 3 September 1939, and Volunteer was assigned to the 15th Destroyer Flotilla. In October 1939 she was transferred to the 17th Destroyer Flotilla in Western Approaches Command for convoy defence operations in the Western Approaches and North Atlantic Ocean, based at Plymouth, and she continued these duties into 1940.

1940
From 27 to 30 March, Volunteer and the sloops  and  escorted Convoy HG 23 during the final portion of its voyage from Gibraltar to Liverpool.

In April 1940, Volunteer was detached to serve under Rear Admiral (Destroyers) in the Home Fleet at Scapa Flow in the Orkney Islands and support the operations of Allied forces in the Norwegian Campaign, which began on 9 April when Germany invaded Norway. She was assigned to escort convoys between the United Kingdom and Norway. While thus engaged, she made an unsuccessful attack on a German submarine on 27 April before escorting Glorious to Scapa Flow for refuelling and aircraft replenishment.

In May 1940 – the month in which her pennant number was changed to I71 – Volunteer continued to deploy off Norway. On 27 May, she, the destroyer , and the sloop  escorted the damaged destroyer , under tow from Skjelfjord, Norway, to the United Kingdom for repairs.

With the German conquest of Norway bringing the Norwegian Campaign to a close, Volunteer returned to Western Approaches Command in June 1940 for convoy defence and patrol duties in the Western Approaches and North Atlantic. On 8 June, Volunteer escorted the heavy cruiser , which had the Norwegian Royal Family embarked, to the Clyde.

In July 1940, Volunteer escorted a convoy bound for Casablanca, French Morocco, for part of its voyage, detaching at Gibraltar to take up duties as a local escort for convoys. In August 1940, she provided local escort services for convoys bound for Operation Menace, the unsuccessful British attempt to occupy Dakar in Senegal, as well as for transatlantic convoys bound for the United Kingdom and two convoys in the English Channel. After the German submarine  torpedoed the light cruiser  on 1 September while underway to join the Dakar occupation force, Volunteer was among the destroyers that escorted her to the River Clyde in Scotland for repairs.

In September 1940, Volunteer was transferred to convoy defence and anti-invasion patrol duties in the English Channel. She participated in night sweeps along the French coast, and in October 1940 took part in Operation Medium as one of two destroyers covering a naval force which bombarded Cherbourg, France. In November or December 1940 (sources differ), she returned to Western Approaches Command and resumed convoy escort operations in the Western Approaches and North Atlantic.

1941

In January 1941, Volunteer was reassigned to the 5th Escort Group, based at Londonderry (also called Derry), Northern Ireland, in which she joined Vanoc, Walker, the destroyer , and nine s. She continued convoy defence operations in the North Atlantic with the group, which was under the command of Commander Donald Macintyre. After Vanoc detected U-110 with radar, the escorts forced the submarine to submerge and depth-charged her. HX 112 then came under attack on 16–17 March by five German submarines, and its escorts were heavily engaged in its defence, during which Vanoc and Walker sank , capturing her commanding officer, Otto Kretschmer, and Vanoc sank , killing her commanding officer, Joachim Schepke.

In April 1941, Volunteer was deployed at Devonport. On 10 or 17-18 April (sources differ) she was taking part in a local exercise when the destroyer  accidentally rammed her off the coast of Ireland. Volunteer suffered six men killed and serious damage to her forward structure. Later in the month, she proceeded to Belfast, Northern Ireland, for repairs at a commercial shipyard until September 1941.

Volunteer returned to action with the 5th Escort Group in October 1941, and with the group formed part of the escort of Convoy HX 155. On 9 December 1941, she put to sea from Milford Haven as part of the escort of the battleship , which was sailing to join the Eastern Fleet, escorting a troop convoy along the way. Ramillies, Volunteer, and the ships accompanying them escorted the convoy, WS 14, from 13 to 15 December 1941, when Volunteer and the destroyer  detached to return to the Clyde after the convoy arrived at Gibraltar.

In December 1941, Volunteer was "adopted" by the city of Hereford in a Warship Week national savings campaign.

1942

On 12 January 1942, Volunteer put to sea from the Clyde with Vanoc, Walker, Witherington, and the destroyer  as the local escort of the military convoy WS 15 during its passage of the Northwestern Approaches, detaching on 15 January to return to the Clyde. After Keppel achieved a radio direction-finding fix on the German submarine U-587 on 26 March 1942, the escorts sighted the submarine on the surface and expended all of their depth charges in attacking her after she submerged. Volunteer detached from the convoy later that day to return to the Clyde.

Volunteer put to sea from the Clyde on 10 May 1942 along with Keppel, Leamington, St. Marys, and the destroyer  to escort the military convoy WS 19 during the first leg of its voyage in the Northwestern Approaches; she detached to return to the Clyde on 13 May.

After her return, Volunteer was assigned to the support of Arctic convoys steaming between the United Kingdom and the Soviet Union. German aircraft continuously shadowed the convoy, and German bombers, torpedo planes, and submarines carried out heavy attacks against it. On 25 March, Volunteer rescued the pilot of a Hawker Hurricane fighter from a Catapult Aircraft Merchantman (CAM ship) after the American merchant ship Carlton mistakenly had shot him down. Before German attacks ceased, PQ-16 had suffered the loss of seven of its 34 merchant ships and damage to four others and to Garland. On 30 March, the escorting ships handed the convoy over to the Eastern Local Escort and proceeded to port in North Russia, where Volunteer remained until she and the same ships that had protected PQ 16 escorted Convoy QP 13 from the Kola Inlet to the United Kingdom in a voyage which began on 26 June 1942. After an uneventful passage, Volunteer detached from the convoy at sea near Bear Island on 5 or 6 July 1942 (sources differ) to proceed to the United Kingdom.

Upon her return, Volunteer entered a dockyard at Rosyth, Scotland, in July 1942 for a refit and to undergo conversion into a Long-Range Escort. She was in dockyard hands for the rest of 1942.

1943

With her conversion complete, Volunteer underwent post-conversion acceptance trials in January 1943 and proceeded to Tobermory on the Isle of Mull for workups. After she completed these in February 1943, she was assigned to the 4th Escort Group – in which she joined Beverley, Highlander, the destroyer , and six Flower-class corvettes – based at Greenock, Scotland.

In March 1943, Volunteer was the flagship of Commander G. J. Luther, commanding the escort – which also included Beverley and the corvettes  and  – of Convoy HX 229, consisting of 40 merchant ships. HX 229 and Convoy SC 122 came under attack by German submarines of the Raubgraf ("Robber Baron") and Dranger ("Harrier") wolfpacks on 16 March, and the action developed into the largest convoy battle of World War II, with 38 German submarines of three wolfpacks involved. During heavy German attacks on 17 March, the submarine U-616 made an unsuccessful torpedo attack on Volunteer. By the time the escorts, outnumbered two-to-one by attacking submarines, received reinforcements on 18 March and the German attacks abated, HX 229 had lost 13 merchant ships sunk, and its escorts, although constantly attacking submarine contacts, had been unable to sink any of the attacking submarines.

In May 1943, Volunteer joined the 5th Escort Group in escorting Convoy ONS 7. The convoy underwent a series of attacks by German submarines of the Donau 1 ("Danube" 1) group from 11 to 13 May, and attacks resumed on 17 May. However, the convoy took evasive action and lost only one merchant ship.

Volunteer continued her North Atlantic convoy defence operations from June to September 1943, but also began escorting convoys between the United Kingdom and Gibraltar carrying troops, equipment, and supplies for Allied offensive operations in Sicily and Italy. From June to September, she also took part in offensive antisubmarine operations by Allied ships and aircraft in the Bay of Biscay targeting German submarines transiting the bay between their bases in German-occupied France and their operating areas in the Atlantic. In October 1943, she participated in Operation Alacrity, the establishment of Allied air and refueling bases in the Azores, by deploying with the 4th and 5th Escort Groups as an escort for convoys carrying personnel, equipment, and supplies to the Azores. In November she returned to the antisubmarine offensive in the Bay of Biscay, and she resumed convoy defence operations in the North Atlantic in December 1943.

1944-1945

Volunteer continued on North Atlantic convoy escort duty until April 1944, when she was reassigned to operations in the English Channel escorting convoys along the coast of Great Britain. Later in the month she was assigned to convoy escort operations in Operation Neptune in support of the Allied invasion of Normandy, scheduled for early June 1944. On 21 April 1944, she and the escort destroyer  and Free French Naval Forces escort destroyer  were in action against German motor torpedo boats – S-boats, known to the Allies as "E-boats" – of the 9th Flotilla off Hastings.

On 4 June, the group escorted Convoy EBC2 – consisting of 32 motor transport carriers and coasters and five oil tankers – from Milford Haven through the Bristol Channel to the Solent; after the landings were postponed from 5 to 6 June due to bad weather, the convoys arrival in the Solent was delayed to 6 June. On 7 June, the second day of the invasion, the convoy and its escorts got underway from the Solent and proceeded to the American beachhead in Normandy, off which they arrived on 8 June. Later that day, Volunteer detached from the convoy to return to Milford Haven and begin escorting convoys bringing reinforcements and supplies to the beaches, the first of which she escorted through the Bristol Channel on 10 June. She continued to escort convoys to Normandy until later in June, when she was released from Operation Neptune.

In July 1944, Volunteer came under the Commander-in-Chief, Portsmouth and returned to the escort of coastal convoys in the English Channel. In August 1944, she was one of the escorts of three tank landing ships which discharged supplies for the United States Armys 12th Army Group at Saint-Michel-en-Grève, France. In November 1944 she became part of the 1st Destroyer Flotilla (Portsmouth), and in December 1944 she became part of the 21st Destroyer Flotilla under the Commander-in-Chief, The Nore at Sheerness. By  January 1945, she was escorting convoys in the Nore, the North Sea, and the English Channel. She continued in these duties without major incident through the surrender of Germany in early May 1945 and until the end of May 1945.

Decommissioning and disposal

Withdrawn from operational service at the end of May 1945, Volunteer was decommissioned and placed in reserve in June 1945, and by July 1945, she no longer appeared on the Royal Navys active list. Placed on the disposal list in 1947, she was sold to BISCO on 3 or 4 March 1947 (sources differ) for scrapping by either M. Brechin or by Granton Shipbreaking (sources differ). She was towed to the shipbreakers yard at Granton, Edinburgh, Scotland, in December 1947 or April 1948 (sources differ) and scrapped there in April 1948.

Notes

Bibliography
 
 
 
 
 
 
 
 
 
 
 
 
 
 

 

V and W-class destroyers of the Royal Navy
1919 ships
Ships built on the River Clyde
World War II destroyers of the United Kingdom
Maritime incidents in April 1941